Alhaji Roland Issifu Alhassan (September 15, 1935 – April 14, 2014) was a Ghanaian politician, lawyer and diplomat. Alhassan was a founding member of the New Patriotic Party (NPP), specifically in the country's Northern Region.

Career 
Alhassan was a commercial farmer who cultivated rice and maize.

Political career 
He served as an  MP for Tolon-Kumbungu from 1969 to 1972 and 1979–1981. In 1992, Alhassan was a candidate for Vice President of Ghana as the running mate of presidential hopeful, Albert Adu Boahen. He also served as Ghana's ambassador to Germany from 2001 to 2006 during the administration of former President John Kufuor.

In addition to his political career, Alhassan was also the first person from Northern Ghana to be called to the Bar and become a lawyer.

Personal life 
He was married to Mrs. Jane Alhassan and they had six children. He was an Islamic Scholar.

Honor 
Alhassan received the Order of the Volta for his service to Ghana in 2008.

Death 
Roland Issifu Alhassan died from a short illness at 37 Military Hospital in Accra, Ghana, on 14 April 2014. He passed at the age of 87. He was buried in his hometown of Kumbungu, Tolon-Kumbungu District, Northern Region.

References

1935 births
2014 deaths
20th-century Ghanaian lawyers
New Patriotic Party politicians
Ghanaian MPs 1969–1972
Ghanaian MPs 1979–1981
Ambassadors of Ghana to Germany
People from Northern Region (Ghana)
Dagomba people